Teinoptila ingens is a moth of the family Yponomeutidae. It is found in Burundi.

External links
Taxonomic study of the genus Teinoptila Sauber, 1902 from China (Lepidoptera: Yponomeutidae)

Yponomeutidae